The Odyssey is a 1997 American mythology–adventure television miniseries based on the ancient Greek epic poem by Homer, the Odyssey. Directed by Andrei Konchalovsky, the miniseries aired in two parts beginning on May 18, 1997, on NBC. It was filmed in Malta, Turkey, parts of England and many other places around the Mediterranean, where the story takes place. The cast includes Armand Assante, Greta Scacchi, Irene Papas, Isabella Rossellini, Bernadette Peters, Eric Roberts, Geraldine Chaplin, Jeroen Krabbé, Christopher Lee and Vanessa Williams.

At the 49th Primetime Emmy Awards the series won the award for Outstanding Directing for a Miniseries or Special.

Plot

Part 1
Odysseus (Armand Assante), the king of the ancient Greek kingdom of Ithaca, is called to service in the Trojan War after the birth of his son Telemachus, much to the dismay of his wife Queen Penelope (Greta Scacchi). Odysseus is worried that he may not return, and tells Penelope that she should remarry by the time Telemachus is a man if he does not return. The war lasts ten years, during which Greece's best soldier, Achilles (Richard Trewett), is killed and the Greeks avenge him by using a giant horse to sneak inside and destroy the city of Troy. Laocoön (Heathcote Williams) tries to warn the Trojans of a vision of this, but is suddenly devoured by a sea monster. Odysseus' ego gets the best of him and he tells the gods that he did it himself, which angers Poseidon (voiced by Miles Anderson) so much that he promises to make Odysseus' journey home to Penelope nearly impossible, mentioning that it was he who sent the sea monster to devour Laocoön.

Odysseus and his men initially stop on an island dominated by one-eyed giants, the Cyclopes. A gargantuan Cyclops named Polyphemus (Reid Asato) traps them in his cave intending to eat them, but Odysseus gets him drunk on wine, causing him to pass out. Then, he sharpens a tree branch into a stake and blinds Polyphemus, allowing them to escape by hiding under sheep skins when he removes the heavy stone door. Polyphemus screams for help, but Odysseus had tricked him into stating that his name was "Nobody", so the Cyclops is shouting that nobody has tricked him, arousing no suspicion. Odysseus and his men escape, but Odysseus brashly taunts the Cyclops who asks his father Poseidon to avenge him. This makes Odysseus' journey home harder.

Odysseus travels to an island where Aeolus (Michael J. Pollard) provides him with a bag of wind to help him home, instructing him to open it when he gets close to Ithaca. One of his men opens it prematurely, blowing them off course. Next, they stop at the island of Circe (Bernadette Peters), a beautiful witch, who turns his men into animals and blackmails him into sleeping with her. Odysseus is told of Circe's magic by Hermes (Freddy Douglas), who helps him avoid being transformed as well. Circe tells him to go to the Underworld next, and only then does Odysseus realize that he has actually been tricked by Circe, who put a spell on him so he stayed on the island for five years instead of five days. Odysseus digs his ship out of the sand and tide and sails to the Underworld.

Part 2
Arriving at the Underworld, Tiresias (Christopher Lee) torments Odysseus, recognizing his courage and wit, but criticizing his ego and foolishness. After Odysseus sacrifices a goat into the River Styx, Tiresias tells him that the only way home will take him past a treacherous isle where Scylla (sea monster) and Charybdis (tidal pool) live. As he is running in terror from the underworld, he meets his mother Anticlea (Irene Papas), who committed suicide due to the pain of losing her son. She informs him that back on Ithaca there are multiple suitors, including Eurymachus (Eric Roberts), vying with each other to marry Penelope for her money and power.

Odysseus' boat nears the isle of Scylla and Charybdis. Scylla's six serpentine heads wreak havoc on the crew, killing many. Everyone but Odysseus is killed when Charybdis creates a whirlpool and destroys his ship. Odysseus arrives on the island where the goddess Calypso (Vanessa Williams) lives and becomes her prisoner. Meanwhile, Odysseus' now 15-year-old son Telemachus (Alan Stenson) tries to find his father and is told by Athena (Isabella Rossellini) to travel to Sparta and seek out one of his former comrades that fought with him. When Telemachus finds Menelaus (Nicholas Clay), one of Odysseus' comrades, he learns that Menelaus doesn't know what happened to Odysseus but believes him to be dead.

Two years later, Hermes arrives, telling Calypso to release Odysseus, and she provides him with a raft to get to Ithaca. Another storm causes problems for Odysseus as he calls out to Poseidon, who reminds Odysseus about what he said the day he left Troy, and to remember his place as a mere mortal. The next morning, Odysseus washes ashore and is found by some Phaeacians girls. With help from Phaeacian King Alcinous (Jeroen Krabbé), they help Odysseus back to Ithaca. They deliver him at night while he is fast asleep, to a hidden harbor on Ithaca. Upon awakening the next morning, he finds himself on Ithaca where is reunited with Telemachus. Using a peasant disguise provided by Athena, Odysseus meets up with Penelope where she decides to hold a contest to find the person who can string Odysseus' bow. After Odysseus wins the contest, Athena lifts his disguise and Odysseus is assisted by Telemachus in slaying Eurymachus and the suitors. Once the suitors are dead, Odysseus is finally reunited with Penelope.

Cast

 Armand Assante as Odysseus
 Greta Scacchi as Penelope
 Geraldine Chaplin as Eurycleia
 Jeroen Krabbé as Alcinous
 Christopher Lee as Tiresias
 Irene Papas as Anticlea
 Bernadette Peters as Circe
 Michael J. Pollard as Aeolus
 Eric Roberts as Eurymachus
 Isabella Rossellini as Athena
 Vanessa Williams as Calypso
 Nicholas Clay as Menelaus
 Adoni Anastassopoulos as Perimides
 Paloma Baeza as Melanthe
 Ron Cook as Eurybates
 Reid Asato as Polyphemus
 Mark Hill as Orsilochus
 Pat Kelman as Elatus
 Vincenzo Nicoli as Antinous
 Sally Plumb as Arete (Queen Alcinous)
 Roger Ashton-Griffiths as Polites
 Katie Carr as Nausicaa
 Marius Combo as Agelaus
 Alan Cox as Elpenor
 William Houston as Anticlus
 Oded Levy as Leocrites
 Peter Page as Philoetius
 Alan Stenson as Telemachus
 Stewart Thompson as Antiphus
 Tony Vogel as Eumaeus
 Heathcote Williams as Laocoön, a soothsayer
 Michael Tezcan as Eurylochus
 Richard Truett as Achilles
 Yorgo Voyagis as King Agamemnon
 Peter Woodthorpe as Mentor
 Derek Lea as Hektor
 Frederick Stuart as Hermes
 Miles Anderson as Poseidon (voice)
 Alan Smithie as King Priam of Troy
 Vernon Dobtcheff as Aegyptus
 Josh Maguire as Young Telemachus

Filming

Special effects
The creature effects for this miniseries were provided by Jim Henson's Creature Shop where they used a talking animatronic pig roasting on a spit, a CGI for Scylla, a rod puppet sea slug-like sea monster that devours Laocoön, and the full-bodied version of Polyphemus.

The boat used in the series was reused a few years later for the Jason and the Argonauts miniseries.

Rating
MPAA rated this film PG-13 for violent sequences and some sensuality.

See also
 Greek mythology in popular culture
 List of historical drama films

References

External links
 
 
 Hallmark Entertainment: The Odyssey

1990s American television miniseries
American Zoetrope films
Sonar Entertainment miniseries
Films set in the Mediterranean Sea
Greek and Roman deities in fiction
Films based on classical mythology
Films directed by Andrei Konchalovsky
Films scored by Eduard Artemyev
Films set in ancient Greece
Films set in Greece
Primetime Emmy Award-winning television series
Television shows based on the Odyssey
Australian action adventure films
Agamemnon